Riantana, or Kimaam, is a language spoken on Yos Sudarso Island in Papua province, Indonesia.

Phonology
Riantana phonemic inventory:

References 

Languages of Papua New Guinea
Kolopom languages